A hypostatic gene is one whose phenotype is altered by the expression of an allele at a separate locus, in an epistasis event.

Example:  In labrador retrievers, the chocolate coat colour is a result of homozygosity for a gene that is epistatic to the "black vs. brown" gene.  The alleles determining whether the dog is black or brown, are that of the hypostatic gene in this event.

See also
 Epistasis
 Bombay phenotype

References

Further reading

Classical genetics